The 2020 Texas Republican presidential primary took place in Texas, United States, on March 3, 2020, as one of 13 contests scheduled on Super Tuesday in the Republican Party primaries for the 2020 presidential election. The Texas primary was an open primary, with the state awarding 155 delegates towards the 2020 Republican National Convention.

Candidates
Filing for the primary began in early November 2019. The following candidates have filed and are on the ballot in Texas:

Running
 Rocky De La Fuente
 Zoltan Istvan
 Matthew Matern
 Donald J. Trump
 Bill Weld

Withdrawn
 Joe Walsh

Results

Results by county

Donald J. Trump won in every county.

See also
 2020 Texas Democratic presidential primary

References

Texas Republican
Republican primary
Texas Republican primaries